Plumb may refer to:

Arts, entertainment, and media
 Plumb, a 1995 album by Jonatha Brooke & The Story
 Plumb (Plumb album), 1997
 Plumb (Field Music album), 2012
 , by Romanian poet George Bacovia

People
 Plumb (surname)
 Plumb (singer) (born 1975), American musician

Places in the United States
 Plumb, Washington, a community
 Plumb Beach, Brooklyn, New York City, New York, a beach and neighborhood
 Plumb Branch, a stream in Linn County, Missouri
 Plumb Brook, a brook in St. Lawrence County, New York
 Plumb Lane, an arterial road in Reno, Nevada
 Plumb Memorial Library, a historic public library in Shelton, Connecticut

Tools
 Plumb bob, a type of tool
 Plumb (tools), a brand of tools known for its hammers

Other uses
 Plumb, to measure the depth of water with a sounding line

See also
 Plumbing
 Plumbo, a Norwegian band
 Plum (disambiguation)
 Plummet (disambiguation)